NCAA Emerging Sports for Women are intercollegiate women's sports that are recognized by the National Collegiate Athletic Association (NCAA) in the United States, but do not have sanctioned NCAA Championships.

History
In 1994, the NCAA adopted the Gender Equity Task Force's recommendation to create a list of emerging sports for women so as to support athletic opportunities for collegiate women. Managed by the Committee on Women's Athletics, the Emerging Sports list started with nine sports, several of which have since attained NCAA Championship status; while other sports have been added or dropped from the list.

Process
To be considered for Emerging Sport status, the sport must meet the following requirements:
 The sport meets the NCAA definition of a sport
 At least 20 varsity or competitive club teams exist at NCAA member schools
 At least 10 NCAA member schools sponsor or intend to sponsor the sport

The Committee on Women's Athletics can recommend an emerging sport to become an NCAA Championship sport once 40 NCAA member schools sponsor it. Once added to the Emerging Sports list, a sport has 10 years to achieve NCAA Championship status, after which it may be removed from the list.

Overview of sports added and dropped

NCAA Sports Sponsorship and Participation Rates Database

Sports

Current emerging sports

Acrobatics & Tumbling

This sport, which combines the internationally recognized gymnastics disciplines of acrobatic gymnastics and tumbling, is one of the two newest Emerging Sports, having been officially added in 2020–21. (The sport currently recognized as "gymnastics" by the NCAA is internationally known as artistic gymnastics.) On June 3, 2019, the NCAA announced that its Committee on Women’s Athletics had recommended the addition of acrobatics & tumbling and wrestling to the Emerging Sports program, effective with the 2020–21 school year. Both sports were formally added to the program on the aforementioned schedule after approval by the membership of all three NCAA divisions, with the final approval coming from Division I on June 17, 2020.

At the time of the formal addition of acrobatics & tumbling to the Emerging Sports program, the National Collegiate Acrobatics and Tumbling Association, which has governed this discipline at college level, indicated that 30 NCAA schools would sponsor the sport in 2020–21. Also at that time, two Division II conferences officially sponsored the sport. The Mountain East Conference began sponsoring the sport in 2018–19, and Conference Carolinas added it for 2020–21. Since becoming an emerging sport, seven additional schools announced intentions to start an acrobatics and tumbling program, bringing the total number of schools sponsoring A&T up to 39 NCAA schools.

Equestrian

As of the 2016–17 school year, 18 Division I (D-I), five Division II (D-II), and 21 Division III (D-III) schools participated in varsity competition. In 2017–18, 16 D-I, five D-II and one D-III schools participated in the NCEA. The total number of NCEA participants rose to 24 for 2018–19.

However, as of the 2020–21 school year, equestrianism is considered an Emerging Sport only in Divisions I and II; competition among Division III schools has remained independent of the NCAA. A total of 16 D-III members sponsored varsity equestrian teams in 2019–20. With that in mind, a group of 21 D-III members submitted a proposal to bring equestrianism in that division under the Emerging Sports umbrella; this proposal was approved by the NCAA Committee on Women's Athletics in September 2019. From there, the proposal was reviewed by three other NCAA committees before a final vote by the entire Division III membership during the 2020 NCAA Convention in January of that year. If the proposal had passed, the number of NCAA equestrian programs would have increased to 40—the number required for an Emerging Sport to enter the process for consideration as an official NCAA championship. However, the Division III membership defeated the proposal to bring D-III equestrian under the NCAA umbrella; the vote was 195–174 against inclusion, with over 100 abstentions.

The University of Georgia has won 11 titles, the most of the NCEA.

In 2016 it was nearly removed from the list, but at the NCAA Convention, the college administrators voted for it to continue.

Rugby

The Penn State University is the women's college team with the most titles (with 16 titles overall including 14 during the period when  NCAA Emerging Sports for Women program has been in effect).

As of the 2016–17 school year, there were seven D-I, three D-II, and four D-III schools participating in varsity competition. Three schools added the sport in 2018–19, and two more did so in 2019–20. Additionally, the National Intercollegiate Rugby Association, which currently administers the college championship, began actively working with more than 20 additional schools during the 2018–19 school year, with the goal of either establishing new women's rugby programs or elevating existing club teams to NCAA status.

Triathlon

Before the 2020 addition of acrobatics & tumbling and wrestling to the program, triathlon had been the newest emerging sport, having received that status in January 2014.

As of the 2017–18 school year, four D-I, eight D-II, and seven D-III schools participated in varsity competition. Nine NCAA schools added the sport in 2018–19, with Hampton becoming the first historically black school to sponsor the sport.

Wrestling

Wrestling was added to the Emerging Sports program alongside acrobatics & tumbling in 2020–21. At the time of the 2019 announcement, the Wrestle Like a Girl organization, along with the sport's national governing body of USA Wrestling, noted that 23 NCAA member institutions sponsored varsity women's wrestling. The number of NCAA women's wrestling schools expanded further to 35 by the time that sport was formally added to the program.

NCAA-recognized women's wrestling does not use the collegiate ruleset of the NCAA men's sport, instead using the international freestyle ruleset. A separate organization that governs club-level college wrestling, the National Collegiate Wrestling Association, uses collegiate rules in both its men's and women's divisions.

Current NCAA sports
Former emerging sports that have since achieved NCAA Championship status:

Rowing

Rowing was the first former emerging sport to become NCAA-sanctioned, in 1997. It was the sport that achieved NCAA status the fastest, obtaining full recognition in two years.

Before rowing became an emerging sport, the University of Washington won nine national titles during the sport's emerging status. Only Princeton University and Brown University won a title after rowing became an NCAA sport. Brown has the most D-I titles, with seven.

As of the 2016–17 school year, there are 89 D-I, 16 D-II, and 41 D-III schools participating in varsity competition.

Ice hockey

In 2001, women's ice hockey became an official NCAA sport.

The University of Minnesota and University of Wisconsin–Madison have the most National Collegiate championships, each with six. Both programs have produced many Olympians for the United States, Canada, and other countries.

As of the most recent 2021–22 season, 112 schools participated in varsity women's ice hockey—41 in the National Collegiate division (36 D-I, five D-II) and 71 in D-III. One D-I school (Robert Morris) will reinstate the sport in 2023–24 after having dropped it following the 2020–21 season.

Water polo

In 2001, women's water polo become an NCAA sport.

UC San Diego was the best team. Before Water Polo became an emerging sport, they had won five titles. During and after the emerging period, UCLA became the dominant university, with 4 Emerging and 7 NCAA titles.

As of the 2016–17 school year, there are 34 D-I, 10 D-II, and 17 D-III schools participating in varsity competition.

Bowling

In 2004, bowling become an official NCAA sport.

The University of Nebraska–Lincoln has the most NCAA titles among bowling programs. The Cornhuskers have won five NCAA Championships and qualified for all 16 tournaments to date.

As of the 2019–20 school year, 34 D-I, 34 D-II, and 19 D-III schools participated in varsity competition.

Beach volleyball

Beach volleyball was the most recent emerging sport to date to become an NCAA sport, doing so in 2016. It only took three years to reach this status.

The four championships have been won by universities located in Los Angeles—the first two by USC, and the two most recent by UCLA.

As of the 2016–17 school year, there are 52 D-I, nine D-II, and three D-III schools participating in varsity competition.

Dropped sports
Former emerging sports that have since been removed include:

Archery

The Arizona State University was the major program before the emerging years. They won 22 titles. During the program, Texas A&M University won 25 titles and since then three.

In the 1998-99 season they had six varsity programs; after that it was dropped until the 2008–09 season. After that season, no school sponsored the sport anymore.

Badminton

Before it was an emerging sport, Arizona State University was the best university with 17 titles. The UC San Diego has four sourced titles between 1995 and 2015.

Badminton had the same decline as Archery, from 10 teams in 1998–99 to two teams in 2008–09. Afterwards, there were no collegiate teams.

Squash

Princeton University won 12 titles before 1994. Harvard University won eight titles between 1995 and 2015. These two schools also have the most overall titles, with 17 for Princeton and 16 for Harvard.

Between 1981 and 1995 around 20 schools sponsored the sport. After that it increased to around 30 and held at this level until now.

Synchronized swimming

Ohio State University has been the most successful collegiate team at synchronized swimming with, 15 before, 13 during, and two titles after the emerging sport period.

Between 1995 and 2009, they were always around eight participating teams. In the 2009–10 season, no university sponsored the sport. Since then it has grown to three teams in the 2016–17 season.

Team handball

Team handball was one of the first nine emerging sports. Between 1997 and 2006, the NCAA sanctioned the Southeast Team Handball Conference.

The current championship for team handball is the College Nationals. Army has won 19 titles, making them the record champion. They won 13 titles during the emerging sport period.

Three universities won the adult National Championships. These are Kansas State University at the first edition in 1975, Ohio State University in 1978, and the University of Minnesota in 1990.

No university ever sponsored Team handball.

Since 2007 until 2017, only the Army and UNC clubs existed. Then the Penn State University women's team was created with help from the Army team. They were able to win at their first appearance at the College Nationals 2018 title.

Timeline of Emerging Sports

Scholarship limits by sport
All sports that the NCAA has classified as emerging sports, whether past or present, have been treated as "equivalency" sports for financial aid purposes. In equivalency sports, each team is restricted to offering athletically-related financial aid equivalent to a set number of full scholarships, with that number typically fixed at a level considerably smaller than the standard squad size. The vast majority of athletic aid awards in such sports are partial scholarships. This contrasts with "head-count" sports, a concept that exists only in Division I, in which the NCAA limits the number of individuals that can receive athletic aid, but allows each to receive up to a full scholarship. Currently, four women's sports are head-count—basketball, gymnastics, tennis, and (indoor) volleyball.

Publications

Footnotes

References

External links
Website
All articles about Emerging Sports at NCAA

 
Women's sports in the United States